The Ministry of Science and Technology (Myanmar) was organized under the Ministry of Education (Myanmar) as the Ministry of Education (Science and Technology) (abbreviated MOE-ST) in April 2016 by U Htin Kyaw's Government. The current responsible minister is Myo Thein Gyi.

There are 57 Universities, Colleges and Institutes under this organization.

See also 
List of Technological Universities in Myanmar

References 

Education (Science and Technology)
Myanmar
Education in Myanmar